Oxalyl dicyanide is a chemical compound with the formula C4N2O2.

Formation
Oxalyl dicyanide can be formed by the hydrolysis of diiminosuccinonitrile.

Reactions
Oxalyl dicyanide can condense with diaminomaleonitrile to make pyrazinetetracarbonitrile and also 5,6-dihydroxypyrazine-2,3-dicarbonitrile, both derivatives of pyrazine.

See also
Cyanogen

References

Acyl cyanides
Inorganic carbon compounds
Inorganic nitrogen compounds